Maricaye Christenson (born January 11, 1948) is an American former professional tennis player.

Tennis career
Born and raised in Grand Junction, Colorado, Christenson was an alternate on the junior U.S. Wightman Cup team and played No. 1 singles for the University of Southern California, after which she competed on the professional tour. She reached the fourth round of the 1974 Wimbledon Championships in mixed doubles. Later in the decade she was a tour manager on the Avon Futures circuit. She was a 2011 inductee into the Colorado Tennis Hall Of Fame.

Personal life
Christenson is married to Don Daniels, who she met while attending USC during the 1960s.

References

External links
 

1948 births
Living people
American female tennis players
USC Trojans women's tennis players
Tennis people from Colorado
People from Grand Junction, Colorado
20th-century American women